Lashkargah Mosque is a mosque in the city of Lashkargah, in Helmand province of south-western Afghanistan.

See also
 List of mosques in Afghanistan

Buildings and structures in Helmand Province
Mosques in Afghanistan